The Face in the Night is a 1924 thriller novel by the British writer Edgar Wallace.

Film adaptation
In 1960 it was turned into the film The Malpas Mystery, directed by Sidney Hayers as part of a long-running series of Wallace films made at Merton Park Studios.

References

Bibliography
 Goble, Alan. The Complete Index to Literary Sources in Film. Walter de Gruyter, 1999.

1924 British novels
Novels by Edgar Wallace
British crime novels
British novels adapted into films